Naseem Vicky (born 18 July 1967) is a television and film actor and also a stand-up comedian, born in Faisalabad, Punjab, Pakistan. In 2000, he migrated to Lahore because of his career. He was in Family Front (1997), a Pakistan Television Corporation TV situation comedy show. He is working in Punjabi dramas as a stand-up comedian and also in some comedy shows on many news channels.
Lately, he has appeared in a comedy show in India. He appeared in Nautanki Ke Super Overs on Colors TV, he is currently doing Comedy Nights Bachao on Colors TV. Naseem Vicky is married to a fellow TV actress Chandani Naseem.

Filmography

Television serials
 ''Rahain TV serial Character Name Falak Sher  1998
 Ahlna
 Family Front (1997) (a popular PTV situation comedy show)
 Dillagi (PTV Drama) (2004) 
 Home Sweet Home
 Janjaal Pura (1997 PTV season)
 Lahori Gate
 Achanak (TV series)
 Ham Sab Umeed Say Hain (2007–2015 TV seasons) (A highly popular situation comedy show, Geo TV production)
 Laugh India Laugh
 Nautanki Ke Super Overs
 Comedy Nights with Kapil
 Chori Chori (PTV Drama)
 Eidi Sab Ke Liye on  ARY Zindagi TV channel
 Comedy Nights Bachao
 The Kapil Sharma Show.

Film
 One Two Ka One
 Devdas 2 (A Pakistani Comedy Movie)
 Kaaf Kangana
  Shotcut
 phatte dinde chak punjabi 
 Maa Da Ladla

Awards and nominations

References

External links 
 , Retrieved 5 February 2017

1976 births
20th-century Pakistani male actors
Living people
Pakistani male comedians
Pakistani stand-up comedians
Pakistani male film actors
Pakistani male television actors
Punjabi people
PTV Award winners
People from Faisalabad
21st-century Pakistani male actors